The Journeyman Project: Pegasus Prime is an adventure computer game developed by Presto Studios and published by Bandai in 1997. It is a complete remake of the original Journeyman Project, using some of the actors from The Journeyman Project 2: Buried in Time.

Story and gameplay

Like the original, this game is played from a first-person perspective, but static location images have been upgraded with walk animations like The Journeyman Project 2: Buried in Time.

The story follows the actions of Temporal Agent Gage Blackwood who travels to three separate points of past to stop three androids who attempt to change history.

Disc layout
Pegasus Prime was split over 4 CD-ROMs. The layout is as follows:
 Disc 1: Caldoria, Norad Alpha
 Disc 2: TSA, Prehistoric Island
 Disc 3: Morimoto Mars Colony
 Disc 4: World Science Center, Norad Delta

Discs 1, 3 and 4 included a "Tiny TSA" which included only the inside of the Pegasus Device. This was included so an additional disc-swap was not required when changing between the 3 time zones.

Development and release
Originally announced as a "Director's Cut", Pegasus Prime featured enhanced graphics, sounds, movies, and puzzles. The new live action video sequences were recorded with a green screen. Pegasus Prime was released solely for the Power Macintosh by Bandai Digital Entertainment in North America. In addition, the title was released in Japan for the Apple Pippin and PlayStation. Presto made plans to port the game to the PlayStation and Sega Saturn in the U.S., but these versions were cancelled when disappointing sales on several games forced publisher Sanctuary Woods to undergo massive layoffs and a corporate restructuring. Acclaim Entertainment later took on publishing the PlayStation version in North America, but this release was cancelled again.

By the fall of 2012 the game began to be supported by beta versions of ScummVM, making it playable for platforms which support this VM. However it requires extraction of the game files from the original CDs (which are written with Apple Macintosh Hierarchical File System) to a hard disk.

In December 2013, the game was released on DVD-ROM for Mac OS X. Windows and Linux versions were made available in March 2014.

The game was released for digital download on GOG.com in 2014 and Steam in 2017.

References

External links 
Official website

1997 video games
Apple Bandai Pippin games
Cancelled Sega Saturn games
First-person adventure games
Linux games
Classic Mac OS games
MacOS games
PlayStation (console) games
Presto Studios games
ScummVM-supported games
Journeyman Project 1
Video game remakes
Video games about time travel
Video games developed in the United States
Video games set in Australia
Video games set in prehistory
Video games set in the 22nd century
Video games set in the 24th century
Video games set on Mars
Windows games
Single-player video games